The Bleriot XXV was a single-seat, high-wing, pusher-type canard monoplane designed by Louis Bleriot. Only one aircraft was built.

Specifications

References

Single-engined tractor aircraft
High-wing aircraft
Canard aircraft
Rotary-engined aircraft
Aircraft first flown in 1911